Pierre Ngaiohni (born 1956) is a New Caledonian politician. He is a pro-independence ethnic Kanak. Ngaiohni was elected Vice President of New Caledonia on June 15, 2009, replacing Déwé Gorodey. Ngaiohni was succeeded by Gilbert Tyuienon in March 2011.

Ngaiohni was elected Vice President five weeks after the 2009 New Caledonia legislative elections. His election was the third attempt to choose a new Vice President. Ngaiohni's candidacy was successful because  pro-independence parties were able to agree on one candidate. Ngaiohni's election cleared the way for the allocation of the other eleven government portfolios.

According to the 1998 Nouméa Accord, the Vice Presidency must be held by a pro-independence politician if the presidency is held by an anti-independence politician.

References

External links
Pacnews: Ngaiohni elected vice president of New Caledonia

1956 births
Living people
Vice presidents of the Government of New Caledonia
People from the Loyalty Islands
Kanak people
Caledonian Union politicians